"Caramel" is the second single released from American hip hop trio City High's self-titled debut album. The single, released on September 11, 2001, features American rapper Eve. It was produced by Jerry Duplessis and written by Ryan Toby. "Caramel" is the group's second-most-successful single, peaking at number 18 on the US Billboard Hot 100 and number nine on the Billboard Hot R&B/Hip-Hop Singles & Tracks chart in January 2002. The track contains vocal samples from the song "Silent Treatment" by the Roots, and a drum sample from Al Green’s “I’m Glad You’re Mine”.

Music video
A music video was produced for the song that begins with the original version and transitions into the Trackmasters remix version. It begins with a shot of Ryan Toby and Robbie Pardlo on a computer that shows the words "Dream Girl 2001". It then cuts to a shot of Ortiz singing the first verse, and then the trio is dancing at a party as Ortiz sings. The video continues switching from Ortiz singing on a couch, the trio at the party, and Ortiz boxing Zab Judah. As the third verse, the first not sung by Ortiz, begins, it features the guys in a car. The video switches to Eve on a motorcycle and starting her rap. The video ends with Toby and Pardlo still in front of the computer, watching the video.

Track listings

US 12-inch single
A1. "Caramel" (LP version featuring Eve) – 3:47
A2. "Caramel" (LP version featuring Eve acappella) – 3:22
A3. "Caramel" (LP version instrumental) – 3:55
B1. "Caramel" (Trackmasters Joint) – 3:46
B2. "Caramel" (Trackmasters Joint instrumental) – 3:46
B3. "Caramel" (LP version) – 3:55

UK CD single
 "Caramel" (video version)
 "Caramel" (Trackmasters Joint)
 "Caramel" (LP version)
 "Caramel" (Saqib remix)
 "Caramel" (CD-ROM video featuring Eve)

UK 12-inch single
A1. "Caramel" (video version) – 3:33
A2. "Caramel" (Trackmasters Joint) – 3:40
B1. "Caramel" (LP version) – 3:30
B2. "Caramel" (Saqib remix) – 4:31

European CD single
 "Caramel" (LP version) – 3:34
 Excerpts from City High – 8:49

Australian CD single
 "Caramel" (LP version featuring Eve) – 3:34
 "Caramel" (Trackmasters Joint) – 3:41
 "Caramel" (Saqib remix) – 4:32
 Excerpts from City High – 8:49
 "Caramel" (video)

Charts

Weekly charts

Year-end charts

Release history

References

2001 singles
2001 songs
City High songs
Eve (rapper) songs
Interscope Records singles
Song recordings produced by Jerry Duplessis
Songs written by Jerry Duplessis
Songs written by Ryan Toby
Songs written by Scott Storch